Culter may refer to:

 Culter, South Lanarkshire, Scotland, United Kingdom
 Culter (fish), a genus of cyprinid fish
 Culter F.C., a junior football club from the village of Peterculter, Aberdeen, Scotland
 Culter School, a primary school in Aberdeen
 Peterculter, commonly shortened to Culter, a suburb of Aberdeen

See also
 Coulter (disambiguation)